Watermelon is a 2003 television film directed by Kieron J. Walsh and starring Anna Friel, Jamie Draven, Ciarán McMenamin, Sean McGinley, and Brenda Fricker. It was released on 16 April 2003 on channel ITV. The screenplay is by Colin Bateman. The film is inspired by the novel of the same name by Marian Keyes. It is a lighthearted Irish drama following the troubles of a young couple when he finds out his beloved is carrying another man’s baby.

Plot
At twenty-nine, Claire has everything she ever wanted: a boyfriend she adores, a great apartment, a good job. Then, she finds out she's pregnant with her ex-boyfriend's baby. She tries to tell her boyfriend, James, that he's not the father, but he doesn't quite give her the chance to get it out. On the day she gives birth, when Claire admits that he's not the father, James informs Claire that he's leaving her. Claire is left with a newborn daughter, a broken heart, and a body that she can hardly bear to look at in the mirror. In the absence of any better offers, Claire decides to go home to her family in Dublin and live with her sister Anna, her soap-watching mother Teresa and her bewildered father Joe. Sheltered by the love of a family, she gets better. Adam, the real father, comes to see Claire and Kate (their daughter), and takes Claire out for dinner with the intention of proposing, "as a moral man". James flies in that same night. When Teresa realizes that James truly loves her daughter, she tells him which restaurant Claire is at. Adam is understanding when Claire chooses James.

Cast

 Anna Friel as Claire Ryan
 Brenda Fricker as Teresa Ryan
 Ciarán McMenamin as  Adam Collins
 Jamie Draven as James Wearing
 Elaine Cassidy as Anna Ryan
 Sean McGinley as Joe Ryan

Reception
Shane Hegarty of The Irish Times wrote: "It wasn't so much an hour and a half you'll never get back, just an hour and half you'll never remember having."

Ratings
The show attracted nearly 6 million viewers, successfully counter-programming against the football match on at the same time.

Awards
Irish Film and Television Awards

|-
| style="text-align:center;" rowspan="3"| 2003
| Linda Mooney and Carol Dunne
| Best Hair / Make-up
| 
|-
| Watermelon
| Best TV Drama
| 
|-
| Eimer Ní Mhaoldomhnaigh
| Best Costume Design
|

References

External links 
 

2003 television films
2003 films
2003 drama films
British pregnancy films
2000s English-language films
2000s British films
British drama television films